Alberto Braga (7 February 1929 – 29 April 2004) was a Brazilian sports shooter. He competed in the 300 m rifle, three positions event at the 1952 Summer Olympics.

References

1929 births
2004 deaths
Brazilian male sport shooters
Olympic shooters of Brazil
Shooters at the 1952 Summer Olympics
Sportspeople from Rio de Janeiro (city)
Pan American Games medalists in shooting
Pan American Games bronze medalists for Brazil
Shooters at the 1951 Pan American Games
Medalists at the 1951 Pan American Games
20th-century Brazilian people
21st-century Brazilian people